12 Classics may refer to:

12 Classics (Bryn Haworth album)
12 Classics (Ed Bruce album)